Striatheca is a genus of beetles in the family Ptinidae. There are at least three described species in Striatheca:

 Striatheca cariniceps Sakai, 1983
 Striatheca filipinae Sakai, 1987
 Striatheca lineata White, 1973

References

Further reading

 
 
 
 
 
 

Ptinidae